Rudolf Khametovich Nureyev (Tatar/Bashkir: Рудольф Хәмит улы Нуриев; ; 17 March 19386 January 1993) was a Soviet-born ballet dancer and choreographer. Nureyev is regarded by some as the greatest male ballet dancer of his generation.

Nureyev was born on a Trans-Siberian train near Irkutsk, Siberia, Soviet Union, to a Tatar family. He began his early career with the company that in the Soviet era was called the Kirov Ballet (now called by its original name, the Mariinsky Ballet) in Leningrad. He defected from the Soviet Union to the West in 1961, despite KGB efforts to stop him. This was the first defection of a Soviet artist during the Cold War, and it created an international sensation. He went on to dance with The Royal Ballet in London and from 1983 to 1989 served as director of the Paris Opera Ballet. Nureyev was also a choreographer serving as the chief choreographer of the Paris Opera Ballet. He produced his own interpretations of numerous classical works, including Swan Lake, Giselle and La Bayadère.

Early life 
Nureyev's grandfather, Nurakhmet Fazlievich Fazliev, and his father, Khamit Fazleevich Nureyev (1903–1985), were from Asanovo in the Sharipov volost of the Ufa District of the Ufa Governorate (now the Ufa District of the Republic of Bashkortostan). His mother, Farida Agliullovna Nureyeva (Agliullova) (1907–1987), was born in the village of Tatarskoye Tyugulbaevo, Kuznechikhinsky volost, Kazan Governorate (now Alkeyevsky District of the Republic of Tatarstan).

Nureyev was born on a Trans-Siberian train near Irkutsk, Siberia, while his mother Farida was travelling to Vladivostok, where his father Khamet, a Red Army political commissar, was stationed. He was raised as the only son with three older sisters in a Tatar Muslim family. In his autobiography, Nureyev noted about his Tatar heritage: "My mother was born in the beautiful ancient city of Kazan. We are Muslims. Father was born in a small village near Ufa, the capital of the Republic of Bashkiria. Thus, on both sides our relatives are Tatars and Bashkirs. I cannot define exactly what it means to me to be a Tatar, and not a Russian, but I feel this difference in myself. Our Tatar blood flows somehow faster and is always ready to boil".

Career

Education at Vaganova Academy
When his mother took Nureyev and his sisters into a performance of the ballet Song of the Cranes, he fell in love with dance. As a child, he was encouraged to dance in Bashkir folk performances and his precocity was soon noticed by teachers who encouraged him to train in Leningrad (now Saint Petersburg). On a tour stop in Moscow with a local ballet company, Nureyev auditioned for the Bolshoi ballet company and was accepted. However, he felt that the Mariinsky Ballet school was the best, so he left the local touring company and bought a ticket to Leningrad.

Owing to the disruption of Soviet cultural life caused by World War II, Nureyev was unable to enroll in a major ballet school until 1955, aged 17, when he was accepted by the Vaganova Academy of Russian Ballet of Leningrad, the associate school of the Mariinsky Ballet. The ballet master Alexander Ivanovich Pushkin took an interest in him professionally and allowed Nureyev to live with him and his wife.

Principal with Kirov Ballet
Upon his graduation in 1958, Nureyev joined the Kirov Ballet (now Mariinsky). He moved immediately beyond the corps level, and was given solo roles as a principal dancer from the outset. Nureyev regularly partnered with Natalia Dudinskaya, the company's senior ballerina and wife of its director, Konstantin Sergeyev. Dudinskaya, who was 26 years his senior, first chose him as her partner in the ballet Laurencia.

Before long, Nureyev became one of the Soviet Union's best-known dancers. From 1958 to 1961, in his three years with the Kirov, he danced 15 roles, usually opposite his partner, Ninel Kurgapkina, with whom he was very well paired, although she was almost a decade older than he was. Nureyev and Kurgapkina were invited to dance at a gathering at Khrushchev's dacha, and in 1959 they were allowed to travel outside the Soviet Union, dancing in Vienna at the International Youth Festival. Not long after, he was told by the Ministry of Culture that he would not be allowed to go abroad again. In one memorable incident, Nureyev interrupted a performance of Don Quixote for 40 minutes, insisting on dancing in tights and not in the customary trousers. He relented in the end, but his preferred dress code was adopted in later performances.

Defection at Paris airport

By the late 1950s, Nureyev had become a sensation in the Soviet Union.

Yet, as the Kirov Ballet was preparing to go on a tour to Paris and London, Nureyev's rebellious character and non-conformist attitude made him an unlikely candidate for the trip, which the Soviet government considered crucial to its ambitions to demonstrate its "cultural supremacy" over the West. Furthermore, tensions were growing between Nureyev and the Kirov's artistic director Konstantin Sergeyev, who was also the husband of Nureyev's former dance partner Natalia Dudinskaya. After a representative of the French tour organisers saw Nureyev dance in Leningrad in 1960, the French organisers urged Soviet authorities to let him dance in Paris, and he was allowed to go.

In Paris, his performances electrified audiences and critics. Oliver Merlin in Le Monde wrote,

I will never forget his arrival running across the back of the stage, and his catlike way of holding himself opposite the ramp. He wore a white sash over an ultramarine costume, had large wild eyes and hollow cheeks under a turban topped with a spray of feathers, bulging thighs, immaculate tights. This was already Nijinsky in Firebird.

Nureyev was seen to have broken the rules about mingling with foreigners and allegedly frequented gay bars in Paris, which alarmed the Kirov's management and the KGB agents observing him. The KGB wanted to send him back to the Soviet Union. On 16 June 1961 when the Kirov company gathered at Le Bourget Airport in Paris to fly to London, Sergeyev took Nureyev aside and told him that he must return to Moscow for a special performance in the Kremlin, rather than go on to London with the rest of the company. Nureyev became suspicious and refused.

Next he was told that his mother had fallen severely ill and he needed to go home immediately to see her. Nureyev refused again, believing that on return to the USSR he was likely to be imprisoned. With the help of French police and a Parisian socialite friend, Clara Saint, who had been engaged to Vincent Malraux, the son of the French Minister of Culture, André Malraux, Nureyev escaped his KGB minders and asked for asylum. Sergeyev and the KGB tried to dissuade him, but he chose to stay in Paris.

Within a week, he was signed by the Grand Ballet du Marquis de Cuevas and performed The Sleeping Beauty with Nina Vyroubova.

On a tour of Denmark he met Erik Bruhn, soloist at the Royal Danish Ballet. Bruhn became his lover, his closest friend and his protector until Bruhn's death in 1986. He and Bruhn both appeared as guest dancers with the newly formed Australian Ballet at Her Majesty's Theatre, Sydney in December 1962.

Soviet authorities made Nureyev's father, mother and dance teacher Pushkin write letters to him, urging him to return, without effect. Although he petitioned the Soviet government for many years to be allowed to visit his mother, he was not allowed to do so until 1987, when his mother was dying and Mikhail Gorbachev consented to the visit.

In 1989, he was invited to dance the role of James in La Sylphide with the Mariinsky Ballet at the Mariinsky Theatre in Leningrad. The visit gave him the opportunity to see many of the teachers and colleagues he had not seen since his defection.

The Royal Ballet

Principal dancer

Dame Ninette de Valois offered him a contract to join The Royal Ballet as Principal Dancer. During his time at the company, however, many critics became enraged as Nureyev made substantial changes to the productions of Swan Lake and Giselle. Nureyev stayed with the Royal Ballet until 1970, when he was promoted to Principal Guest Artist, enabling him to concentrate on his increasing schedule of international guest appearances and tours.  He continued to perform regularly with The Royal Ballet until committing his future to the Paris Opera Ballet in the 1980s.

Fonteyn and Nureyev

Nureyev's first appearance with Prima Ballerina Dame Margot Fonteyn was in a ballet matinée organised by The Royal Ballet: Giselle, 21 February 1962. The event was held in aid of the Royal Academy of Dance, a classical ballet teaching organisation of which she was president.  He danced Poème Tragique, a solo choreographed by Frederick Ashton, and the Black Swan pas de deux from Swan Lake. They were so well received that Fonteyn and Nureyev proceeded to form a partnership that endured for many years. They premiered Romeo and Juliet for the company in 1965. Fans of the duo would tear up their programs to make confetti that would be joyously thrown at the dancers. Nureyev and Fonteyn might do upwards of 20 curtain calls.

On 11 July 1967, Fonteyn and Nureyev, after performing in San Francisco, were arrested on nearby roofs, having fled during a police raid on a home in the Haight-Ashbury district. They were bailed out, and charges of disturbing the peace and visiting a place where marijuana was used were dropped later that day for lack of sufficient evidence.

Other international appearances
Among many appearances in North America, Nureyev developed a long-lasting connection with the National Ballet of Canada, appearing as a guest artist on many occasions. In 1972, he staged a spectacular new production of Sleeping Beauty for the company, with his own additional choreography augmenting that of Petipa. The production toured widely in the U.S. and Canada after its initial run in Toronto, one performance of which was televised live and subsequently issued on video.

Among the National Ballet's ballerinas, Nureyev most frequently partnered with Veronica Tennant and Karen Kain. In 1975 Nureyev worked extensively with American Ballet Theatre resurrecting Le Corsaire with Gelsey Kirkland. He recreated Sleeping Beauty, Swan Lake, and Ramonda with Cynthia Gregory. Gregory and Brun joined Nureyev in a pas des trois from the little-known August Bournonville ballet La Ventana.

Director of the Paris Opera Ballet
In January 1982, Austria granted Nureyev citizenship, ending more than twenty years of statelessness. In 1983, he was appointed director of the Paris Opera Ballet, where, as well as directing, he continued to dance and to promote younger dancers. He remained there as a dancer and chief choreographer until 1989. Among the dancers he mentored were Sylvie Guillem, Isabelle Guérin, Manuel Legris, Elisabeth Maurin, Élisabeth Platel, Charles Jude, and Monique Loudières.

His artistic directorship of the Paris Opera Ballet was a great success, lifting the company out of a dark period. His The Sleeping Beauty remains in the repertoire and was revived and filmed with his protégé Manuel Legris in the lead.

Despite advancing illness towards the end of his tenure, he worked tirelessly, staging new versions of old standbys and commissioning some of the most ground-breaking choreographic works of his time. His own Romeo and Juliet was a popular success. When he was sick towards the end of his life, he worked on a final production of La Bayadère which closely follows the Mariinsky Ballet version he danced as a young man.

Final years

When AIDS appeared in France's news around 1982, Nureyev took little notice. The dancer tested positive for HIV in 1984, but for several years he simply denied that anything was wrong with his health. However, by the late 1980s his diminished capabilities disappointed his admirers who had fond memories of his outstanding prowess and skill. Nureyev began a marked decline only in the summer of 1991 and entered the final phase of the disease in the spring of 1992.

In March 1992, living with advanced AIDS, he visited Kazan and appeared as a conductor in front of the audience at Musa Cälil Tatar Academic Opera and Ballet Theater, which now presents the Rudolf Nureyev Festival in Tatarstan. Returning to Paris, with a high fever, he was admitted to the hospital Notre Dame du Perpétuel Secours in Levallois-Perret, a suburb northwest of Paris, and was operated on for pericarditis, an inflammation of the membranous sac around the heart. At that time, what inspired him to fight his illness was the hope that he could fulfill an invitation to conduct Prokofiev's Romeo and Juliet at an American Ballet Theatre benefit on 6 May 1992 at the Metropolitan Opera House in New York. He did so and was elated at the reception.

In July 1992, Nureyev showed renewed signs of pericarditis but determined to forswear further treatment. His last public appearance was on 8 October 1992, at the premiere at Palais Garnier of a new production of La Bayadère that he choreographed after Marius Petipa for the Paris Opera Ballet. Nureyev had managed to obtain a photocopy of Ludwig Minkus' original score when in Russia in 1989.  The ballet was a personal triumph although the gravity of his condition was evident. The French Culture Minister, Jack Lang, presented him that evening on stage with France's highest cultural award, the Commandeur de l'Ordre des Arts et des Lettres.

Death

Nureyev re-entered the hospital Notre Dame du Perpétuel Secours in Levallois-Perret on 20 November 1992 and remained there until his death from AIDS complications at age 54 on 6 January 1993. His funeral was held in the marble foyer of the Paris Garnier Opera House. Many paid tribute to his brilliance as a dancer. One such tribute came from Oleg Vinogradov of the Mariinsky Ballet, stating: "What Nureyev did in the west, he could never have done here."

Nureyev's grave, at the Russian cemetery in Sainte-Geneviève-des-Bois near Paris, features a tomb draped in a mosaic of an Oriental carpet. Nureyev was an avid collector of beautiful carpets and antique textiles. As his coffin was lowered into the ground, music from the last act of Giselle was played and his ballet shoes were cast into the grave along with white lilies.

Tributes

After so many years of having been denied a place in the Mariinsky Ballet's history, Nureyev's reputation was restored. His name was re-entered in the history of the Mariinsky, even though he danced there for only three years. Some of his personal effects were placed on display at the theatre museum in what is now St. Petersburg. A rehearsal room was named in his honour at the famed Vaganova Academy. As of October 2013, the Centre National du Costume de Scène has a permanent collection of Nureyev's costumes "that offers visitors a sense of his exuberant, vagabond personality and passion for all that was rare and beautiful." In 2015, he was inducted into the Legacy Walk.

Since his death in 1993, the Paris Opera has instituted a tradition of presenting an evening of dance homage to Nureyev every 10 years. Because he was born in March, these performances have so far been given on 20 March 2003 and 6 March 2013. Peers of Nureyev who speak about and remember him, like Mikhail Baryshnikov, are often deeply touched.

On 7 November 2018, a monument honouring Nureyev was unveiled at the square near the Musa Cälil Tatar Academic Opera and Ballet Theater in Kazan. The monument was designed by Zurab Tsereteli and its unveiling ceremony was attended by President of Tatarstan Rustam Minnikhanov, state adviser of the Republic of Tatarstan Mintimer Shaimiev and mayor of Kazan Ilsur Metshin. At a speech in the unveiling event, Minnikhanov stated "I think, not only for the republic, Rudolf Nureyev is an international value. Such people are born once in a hundred years."

Repertoire
A selected list of ballet performances, ballet productions and original ballets.

Dance partnerships

Yvette Chauviré of the Paris Opera Ballet often danced with Nureyev; he described her as a "legend". (Chauviré attended his funeral with French dancer and actress Leslie Caron.)

At the Royal Ballet, Nureyev and Margot Fonteyn became long-standing dance partners. Nureyev once said of Fonteyn, who was 19 years older than him, that they danced with "one body, one soul". Together Nureyev and Fonteyn premiered Sir Frederick Ashton's ballet Marguerite and Armand, a ballet danced to Liszt's Piano Sonata in B minor, which became their signature piece. Kenneth MacMillan was forced to allow them to premiere his Romeo and Juliet, which was intended for two other dancers, Lynn Seymour and Christopher Gable. Films exist of their partnership in Les Sylphides, Swan Lake, Romeo and Juliet, and other roles. They continued to dance together for many years after Nureyev's departure from the Royal Ballet. Their last performance together was in Baroque Pas de Trois on 16 September 1988 when Fonteyn was 69, Nureyev was aged 50, with Carla Fracci, aged 52, also starring.

He celebrated another long-time partnership with Eva Evdokimova. They first appeared together in La Sylphide (1971) and in 1975 he selected her as his Sleeping Beauty in his staging for London Festival Ballet. Evdokimova remained his partner of choice for many guest appearances and tours across the globe with "Nureyev and Friends" for more than fifteen years.

During his American stage debut in 1962, Nureyev also partnered with Sonia Arova at New York City's Brooklyn Academy of Music. In collaboration with Ruth Page's Chicago Opera Ballet, they performed the grand pas de deux from Don Quixote.

Legacy

As an influence

 Nureyev was above all a stickler for classical technique, and his mastery of it made him a model for an entire generation of dancers. If the standard of male dancing rose so visibly in the West after the 1960s, it was largely because of Nureyev's inspiration.

Nureyev's influence on the world of ballet changed the perception of male dancers; in his own productions of the classics the male roles received much more choreography. Another important influence was his crossing the borders between classical ballet and modern dance by performing both. Today it is normal for dancers to receive training in both styles, but Nureyev was the originator and excelled in modern and classical dance. He went out of his way to work with modern dance great, Martha Graham, and she created a work specially for him. While Gene Kelly had done much to combine modern and classical styles in film, he came from a more Modern Dance influenced "popular dance" environment, while Nureyev made great strides in gaining acceptance of Modern Dance in the "Classical Ballet" sphere.

Nureyev's charisma, commitment and generosity were such that he did not just pass on his knowledge. He personified the school of life for a dancer. Several dancers, who were principals with the Paris Opera Ballet under his direction, went on to become ballet directors themselves inspired to continue Nureyev's work and ideas. Manuel Legris was director of the Vienna State Ballet and now directs La Scala Theatre Ballet, Laurent Hilaire was ballet director of the Stanislavski Theatre of Moscow and is now director of Bavarian State Ballet at Munich, and Charles Jude was ballet director of the Grand Théâtre de Bordeaux.

Mikhail Baryshnikov, the other great dancer who like Nureyev defected to the West, holds Nureyev in high regard. Baryshnikov said in an interview that Nureyev was an unusual man in all respects, instinctive, intelligence, constant curiosity, and extraordinary discipline, that was his goal of life and of course love in performing.

Technique and quest for perfection
Nureyev had a late start to ballet and had to perfect his technique to be a success. John Tooley wrote that Nureyev grew up very poor and had to make up for three to five years in ballet education at a high-level ballet school, giving him a decisive impetus to acquire the maximum of technical skills and to become the best dancer working on perfection during his whole career. The challenge for all dancers whom Nureyev worked with was to follow suit and to share his total commitment for dance. Advocates to describe the Nureyev phenomenon precisely are John Tooley, former general director of the Royal Opera House, London, Pierre Bergé, former president of Opéra Bastille, venue of the Paris Opera Ballet (in addition to the Palais Garnier) and Manuel Legris, principal dancer with the Paris Opera Ballet nominated by Nureyev in New York.

Nureyev put it like this: "I approach dancing from a different angle than those who begin dancing at 8 or 9. Those who have studied from the beginning never question anything." Nureyev entered the Vaganova Ballet Academy at the age of just 17 staying there for only 3 years compared to dancers who usually become principal dancers after entering the Vaganova school at 9 and go through the full 9 years of dance education. Nureyev was a contemporary of Vladimir Vasiliev, who was the premiere dancer at the Bolshoi. Later, Nureyev was a predecessor to Mikhail Baryshnikov at the Kirov Ballet, now the Mariinsky Theater. Unlike Vasiliev and Baryshnikov, Nureyev did not build his reputation on success in international ballet competitions, but rather through his performances and popular image.

Paradoxically, both Nureyev and Mikhail Baryshnikov became masters of perfection in dance. Dance and life was one and the same, Pierre Bergé said about Nureyev: "He was a dancer like any other dancer. It is extraordinary to have 19 points out of 20. It is extremely rare to have 20 out of 20. However, to have 21 out of 20 is even much rarer. And this was the situation with Nureyev." Legris said: "Rudolf Nureyev was a high-speed train (he was a TGV)." Working with Nureyev involved having to surpass oneself and "stepping on it."

Personal life

Nureyev did not have much patience with rules, limitations and hierarchical order and had at times a volatile temper. He was apt to throw tantrums in public when frustrated. His impatience mainly showed itself when the failings of others interfered with his work.

He socialised with Gore Vidal, Freddie Mercury, Jackie Kennedy Onassis, Mick Jagger, Liza Minnelli, Andy Warhol, Lee Radziwill and Talitha Pol, Jessye Norman, Tamara Toumanova and occasionally visited the New York discotheque Studio 54 in the late 1970s, but developed an intolerance for celebrities.
He kept up old friendships in and out of the ballet world for decades, and was considered to be a loyal and generous friend.

Most ballerinas with whom Nureyev danced, including Antoinette Sibley, Cynthia Gregory, Gelsey Kirkland and Annette Page, paid tribute to him as a considerate partner. He was known as extremely generous to many ballerinas, who credit him with helping them during difficult times. In particular, the Canadian ballerina Lynn Seymour – distressed when she was denied the opportunity to premiere MacMillan's Romeo and Juliet – says that Nureyev often found projects for her even when she was suffering from weight problems and depression and thus had trouble finding roles.

Depending on the source, Nureyev is described as either bisexual, as he did have heterosexual relationships as a younger man, or homosexual. He had a turbulent personal life, with numerous bathhouse visits and anonymous pick-ups. Nureyev met Erik Bruhn, the celebrated Danish dancer, after Nureyev defected to the West in 1961. Nureyev was a great admirer of Bruhn, having seen filmed performances of the Dane on tour in the Soviet Union with the American Ballet Theatre; although stylistically the two dancers were very different. Bruhn and Nureyev became a couple and the two remained together on and off, with a very volatile relationship for 25 years, until Bruhn's death in 1986.

In 1978, Nureyev met the 23-year-old American dancer and classical arts student Robert Tracy and a two-and-a-half-year love affair began. Tracy later became Nureyev's secretary and live-in companion for over 14 years in a long-term open relationship until death. According to Tracy, Nureyev said that he had a relationship with three women in his life, he had always wanted a son, and once had plans to father one with Nastassja Kinski.

Awards and honours

Film, television and musical roles

In 1962, Nureyev made his screen debut in a film version of Les Sylphides. He decided against an acting career to branch into modern dance with the Dutch National Ballet in 1968. Nureyev also made his debut in 1962 on network television in America partnered with Maria Tallchief dancing the pas de deux from August Bournonville's Flower Festival in Genzano on the Bell Telephone Hour.

In 1972, Sir Robert Helpmann invited him to tour Australia with Nureyev's production of Don Quixote. 
In 1973, a film version of Don Quixote was directed by Nureyev and Helpmann and features Nureyev as Basilio, Lucette Aldous as Kitri, Helpmann as Don Quixote and artists of the Australian Ballet.

In 1972, Nureyev was a guest in David Winters' television special The Special London Bridge Special. In 1973 he appeared in a cameo for The Morecambe & Wise Show Christmas Special.

In 1977, Nureyev played Rudolph Valentino in Ken Russell's film Valentino.

In 1978, he appeared as a guest star on the television series The Muppet Show where he danced in a parody called "Swine Lake", sang "Baby, It's Cold Outside" in a sauna duet with Miss Piggy, and sang and tap-danced in the show's finale, "Top Hat, White Tie and Tails". His appearance is credited with making Jim Henson's series become one of the most sought after programs to appear in.

In 1983, he had a non-dancing role in the movie Exposed with Nastassja Kinski.

In 1989, he toured the United States and Canada for 24 weeks with a revival of the Broadway musical The King and I.

Documentary films 
 Rudolf Noureev au travail à la barre (Rudolf Noureev Exercising at the Barre) (1970) (4 min 13)
 Nureyev (1981), by Thames Television. Includes a candid interview, as well as access to him in the studio.
Nureyev (1991). Directed by Patricia Foy, the 90-minute documentary chronicles the ups and downs of Nureyev's career, and his professional relationship with Margot Fonteyn, his rumoured depression and his overall effect on modern dance.
Rudolf Nureyev – As He Is (1991). Directed by Nikolai Boronin, the 47-minute Soviet documentary about Nureyev also includes a long interview with Nureyev during his visit to Leningrad in 1990.
 Nureyev: From Russia With Love (2007), by John Bridcut
Rudolf Nureyev: Rebellious Demon (2012). Directed by Tatyana Malova, the Russian documentary explores the life of Nureyev. The documentary was released on the 80th birth anniversary of Nureyev.
 Rudolf Nureyev – Dance To Freedom (2015), Richard Curson Smith
 Rudolf Nureev. The Island of his Dream (2016) by Evgeniya Tirdatova
Nureyev: Lifting the Curtain (2018). Directed by David and Jacqui Morris, the documentary looks into the extraordinary life of Nureyev, with archive interviews and dance sequences.

Posthumous representation in books and film

Books
 Novel based on Nureyev's life.

Film
The White Crow (2018). Directed by Ralph Fiennes, Oleg Ivenko plays Nureyev as an adult. The film culminates in his defection at Le Bourget Airport when he was 23 years old. Earlier scenes narrate Nureyev's life: from his birth aboard the train, to childhood lessons in his native Tatar dance, his "ruthless dedication" to the art form, his rigorous training and early ballet performances at the Mariinsky Theater. The film shows his strong individualist tendency and aloof demeanour, at times appearing arrogant and even cruel.

See also
 List of dancers
 List of Eastern Bloc defectors
 List of Russian ballet dancers

Notes and references

Sources

External links 

 Website of the Rudolf Nureyev Foundation
 Frank A. Florentine Papers Relating to Rudolf Nureyev at the Library of Congress
 
 
Rudolph Nureyev FBI Records: The Vault, U.S. Federal Bureau of Investigation

Reviews and interviews
 "Balanchine-Robbins Work for Nureyev From Moliere; The Casts", The New York Times, Anna Kisselgoff, 9 April 1979
 Mikhail Baryshnikov speaks about Rudolf Nureyev, interview by David Makhateli, D&D Art Productions (1 min 55)
BBC Interviews with Nureyev
New York Sun review of PBS's "Nureyev: The Russian Years"
 Lord of the dance – Rudolf Nureyev at the National Film Theatre, London, 1–31 January 2003

1938 births
1993 deaths
20th-century Russian ballet dancers
20th-century Russian LGBT people
20th-century Russian male actors
AIDS-related deaths in France
Ballet choreographers
Burials at Sainte-Geneviève-des-Bois Russian Cemetery
Chevaliers of the Légion d'honneur
Commandeurs of the Ordre des Arts et des Lettres
French LGBT actors
LGBT choreographers
LGBT dancers
LGBT Muslims
Paris Opera Ballet artistic directors
People from Irkutsk Oblast
Principal dancers of The Royal Ballet
Prix Benois de la Danse jurors
Russian choreographers
Russian LGBT actors
Russian male ballet dancers
Russian male film actors
Soviet defectors
Soviet emigrants to France
Soviet male actors
Soviet male ballet dancers
Tatar people
Vaganova graduates
Volga Tatar people